Etienne Bax (born 9 August 1988) is a Dutch sidecarcross rider and the 2015, 2017, 2019 and 2021 World Champion. He also became a three-time runner-up, having come second overall in 2012, 2013 and 2014.

Bax has also won the Dutch national championship on five occasions, in 2010, 2011, 2012, 2014 and 2015.

Racing career

Dutch National Championship
Racing from an early age Bax first took part in the Dutch amateur championship which he won in 2004. From 2007 he entered the Dutch national championship, coming fourth in its first season there. Bax repeated this result in 2008 and 2009 before taking out three consecutive national titles from 2010 to 2012, the first two with Ben van den Bogaart as his passenger, the third with Kaspars Stupelis. After another fourth place in 2013 Bax won his fourth national title in 2014, again with Stupelis as his passenger and repeated this result in 2015.

Sidecarcross World Championship
Etienne Bax made his debut in the World Championship in 2007 with passenger Marc van Deutekom at his side, coming twenty-first overall with a twelfth place in Plomion as their best race result. The pair was more successful in 2008, finishing tenth in the WC and achieving a podium finish when they came third in the second race of the German Grand Prix in Strassbessenbach. Bax raced for a third season with van Deutekom in 2009, now finishing eighth in the WC.

In 2010 and 2011 Bax raced with Ben van den Bogaart as his passenger with the new combination finishing fourth in the WC and taking out two race wins and winning the final two Grand Prix of the season in Rudersberg, Germany. In 2011 Bax and van den Bogaart came fifth in the WC, achieved three race and one Grand Prix win.

From 2012 onwards Bax raced with Latvian passenger Kaspars Stupelis, a former double World Champion in the sport. In their first season together the pair came second in the WC, finishing only five points behind eventual winner Daniël Willemsen. The team took out nine race wins and won five Grand Prix that season. Bax and Stupelis came second once more in 2013, now to Belgian driver Ben Adriaenssen who raced with Ben van den Bogaart but despite fifteen race and six Grand Prix wins Bax finished almost 100 points behind the World Champions. Bax had suffered an internal injury just before the start of the season and required surgery, missing the opening Grand Prix of the season in the process.

Bax came second in the WC for a third consecutive time in 2014, finishing eighteen points behind Adriaenssen. Bax and Stupelis won eight races that season and five Grand Prix and dominated the final three events of the year, but having the last race of the season, in Rudersberg, cancelled because of bad weather. Bax had entered the last Grand Prix of the season 28 points behind the leaders and made up ten points in the first race but missed out on a chance to still win the Championship when the second race was cancelled.

Bax, with Stupelis as his passenger once more, won the 2015 Sidecarcross World Championship, taking out the title in the second-last event of the season. In October 2015 it was announced that Bax would race with his younger brother Robbie as passenger instead of Stupelis in 2016 and that the team would switch to Yamaha engines. Lack of engine performance forced Bax to switch back, with the approval from Yamaha, from a four-stroke Yamaha to a two-stroke Zabel engine in an attempt to achieve better results and podium finishes.

Personal life
He is the older brother of Robbie Bax (born 18 October 1991) who himself is active in the Sidecarcross World Championship as a passenger and who raced with Etienne in the early days of their careers.

Etienne Bax used to be a roofer by profession before he turned full professional in 2015 and lives in Bergeijk, North Brabant. He is married and has a daughter (born in 2014) and a son (born in 2018)

Season by season

World Championship
The season by season results in the World Championship for Etienne Bax:

Championships overview

Key

Honours
 Sidecarcross World Championship
 Winner: (2) 2015, 2017
 Runners-up: (3) 2012–2014
 Dutch National Sidecarcross Championship 
 Winners: (4) 2010–2012, 2014, 2015

References

External links
 Official website 
 The World Championship on Sidecarcross.com

1988 births
Living people
Dutch sidecarcross riders
People from Bergeijk
Sportspeople from North Brabant